The 2015 Bath and North East Somerset Council election took place on 7 May 2015 to elect members of Bath and North East Somerset Council in England. This coincided with other local elections and the 2015 general election.

Election results

Ward results
The ward results listed below are based on the changes from the 2011 elections, not taking into account any party defections or by-elections. Sitting councillors are marked with an asterisk (*).

Abbey

Bathavon North

Bathavon South

Bathavon West

Bathwick

Chew Valley North

Chew Valley South

Clutton

Combe Down

Farmborough

High Littleton

Keynsham East

Keynsham North

Keynsham South

Kingsmead

Lambridge

Lansdown

Lyncombe

Mendip

Midsomer Norton North

Midsomer Norton Redfield

Newbridge

Odd Down

Oldfield

Paulton

Peasedown

Publow and Whitchurch

Radstock

Saltford

Southdown

Timsbury

Twerton

Walcot

Westfield

Westmoreland

Weston

Widcombe

By-elections between 2015 and 2019

Abbey

Walcot

Newbridge

Kingsmead

References

2015 English local elections
May 2015 events in the United Kingdom
2015
2010s in Somerset